Brown Township is one of the fourteen townships of Carroll County, Ohio, United States. As of the 2020 census the township had a population of 7,214.

Geography
Located in the northwestern corner of the county, it borders the following townships:
Paris Township, Stark County - north
West Township, Columbiana County - northeast corner
Augusta Township - east
Washington Township - southeast corner
Harrison Township - south
Rose Township - southwest
Sandy Township, Stark County - west
Osnaburg Township, Stark County - northwest

Two incorporated villages are located in Brown Township: Malvern in the center, and part of Minerva in the northeast. The unincorporated community of Lake Mohawk, a census-designated place, is in the southwest part of the township, and Pekin, another unincorporated community and census-designated place, is in the northeast part, next to Minerva.

Ohio State Route 43 passes through the township, leading west then north from Malvern  to the center of Canton and southeast  to Carrollton, the county seat. Ohio State Route 183 leads northeast from OH 43  to Minerva.

Malvern, Pekin, and Minerva are in the valley of Sandy Creek, a west-flowing tributary of the Tuscarawas River, part of the Ohio River watershed.

Name and history
It is one of eight Brown Townships statewide.

This township was named for John Brown, who then resided at Pekin, and who built the first mill in that part of Carroll County. Brown Township was made an independent township in 1815 while a part of Stark County.
 With the formation of Carroll County in 1833, two miles off the east side of Sandy Township were annexed to the west side of Brown Township, creating an eight mile wide township.

Government

The township is governed by a three-member board of trustees, who are elected in November of odd-numbered years to a four-year term beginning on the following January 1. Two are elected in the year after the presidential election and one is elected in the year before it. There is also an elected township fiscal officer, who serves a four-year term beginning on April 1 of the year after the election, which is held in November of the year before the presidential election. Vacancies in the fiscal officership or on the board of trustees are filled by the remaining trustees.

Education
Students attend the Minerva Local School District in the eastern part and Brown Local School District in the center and west part.

References

External links
Township website
County website

Townships in Carroll County, Ohio
Populated places established in 1815
1815 establishments in Ohio
Townships in Ohio